Suleiman Dikko (born 31 December 1955) is a Nigerian who is the current Chief Judge of Nasarawa State.  

In 2019, Dikko threatened to sack judges who arrive late in court for case hearings.  He also warned the Nigerian Police that he would stop signing arrest warrants to the police for delayed prosecution of crime suspects already remanded in prison. 

In February 2019, the Judiciary Staff Union of Nigeria (JUSUN) called for Dikko to be fired from his position as Chief Judge for illegal deductions from judiciary workers’ salaries. Later that month, Dikko was prevented from gaining access to his office for hours before eventual being allowed access to his office after pleading with protesting judiciary workers.

In May 2020, Dikko granted  pardon to 20 inmates in Nasarawa State in a move to decongest prisons.

Career 
Dikko was called to the Nigerian Bar in October 1986. He was appointed a Judge of the High Court in Lafia, Nasarawa State in April 1986 ,presiding over High Court No.1.

References 

Nasarawa State
Nigerian judges
1955 births
Living people